Bonnie Jean Baxter (born 1946) is an American artist (born in Texarkana, Texas). She studied art in Illinois (1965-1967) and Michigan (1967-1969) and came to Montreal, Canada, with her artist husband, Pierre Lemieux, in 1970. She has lived in Canada since 1972. She was one of the first members of the Atelier de l’Île and created Atelier Le Scarabée. She printed for other Canadian artists such as Canadian artist Jean-Paul Riopelle and René Derouin. Baxter is known for her artworks that combine animal and human forms. 

In 2017 she was awarded the prix Charles-Biddle. In 2019 she was the subject of a retrospective exhibition at the Musée d’art contemporain des Laurentides. Her work has been presented in Canada and internationally including solo exhibitions at Musée d'art contemporain des Laurentides (MACLAU) and at the Bob Rauschenberg Gallery in Florida.

Baxter's work is included in the collection of the Musée national des beaux-arts du Québec.Bonnie Baxter is represented by the gallery Blouin | Division in Montréal Québec.

References

1946 births
20th-century Canadian women artists
21st-century Canadian women artists
Living people